Gitte Hansen  (born 21 September 1961) is a Danish footballer who played as a goalkeeper for the Denmark women's national football team. She was part of the team at the 1984 European Competition for Women's Football and inaugural 1991 FIFA Women's World Cup. At the club level, she played for B 1909 in Denmark.

References

External links
 

1961 births
Living people
Danish women's footballers
Denmark women's international footballers
Place of birth missing (living people)
1991 FIFA Women's World Cup players
Women's association football goalkeepers